Nallathur is a village in the Cuddalore district of Tamil Nadu, one of 28 states of India. Nallathur's postal code is 605 106.

Demographics 
According to the 2011 Indian census, the population of Nallathur was 4,456, of which 2,238 were male (50.02%) and 2,218 were female (49.98%). 495 (11.1%) of them were aged six or under. The literacy rate was 68.6% (3,057 literate); 75% of males and 61.7% of females were literate. 51.7% of the population was employed (63.7% male, 39.5% female). Scheduled castes made up 26.4% of the population. There were no people from scheduled tribes.

Nearby towns and villages 
Other nearby towns include Pondicherry: , Panruti:  and Villupuram: . Nallathur is surrounded by villages of Puducherry on three sides: Embalam (East), Manakuppam (West), and Sivaranthagam (North). The Malattaru borders the southern part of the village. Two nearby villages Melakuppam and N.Manaveli are under the Nallathur Panchayat.

Climate 
The town gets its rainfall from the northeast monsoon in winter and the southwest monsoon in summer.

Temples 

Nallathur is also known as "Temple village" and the place of Sivaprakasa Swamigal Jeeva samadhi.

 Sri Swarnapureeswarar Temple is a temple of Shiva in Nallathur.
 Sri Lakshmi Narayana Varadharaja Perumal Koil 
 Thuraimangalam Siva Prakasar Jeeva Samadhi Aalayam
 Sri Arni Periyapalayathu Amman Temple
 Sri Draupathi Amman Dharma Raja Temple
 Sri Kali Amman Temple
 Sri Selva Vinayagar Temple
 Sri Naga Muthumari Amman Temple
 Sri Muthu Mariyamman Temple
 Sri Gangai Amman Temple

Colleges 
 Sri Venkateshwara Medical college Hospital and Research Centre, Ariyur, Pondicherry:  
 Sri Manakula Vinayagar Medical College and Hospital, Madagadipet, Pondicherry: 
 Aarupadai Veedu Medical College and Hospital, Kirumbampakkam, Pondicherry: 
 Mahatma Gandhi Medical College and Research Institute, Pillaiyarkuppam, Pondicherry: 
 Sri Manakula Vinayagar Engineering College, Madagadipet, Pondicherry: 
 Manakula Vinayagar Institute of Technology, Kalitheerthalkuppam, Pondicherry: 
 Sri Jayaram Engineering College
 IFET College of Engineering, Villupuram District:

Schools 

Appar Government Aided Middle School, Nallathur
 Swami vivekananda High School, Manakuppam: 
 Maraimalai Adigal Government Higher Secondary School, Embalam: 
 Government Higher Secondary School, Thookanampakkam: 
 St. Joseph’s Higher Secondary School, Manjakuppam Cuddalore
 Vallalar Government Higher Secondary School, Kandamangalam: 
 Balaji English Higher Secondary School, Embalam: ,
 Government High School Pakkam:

Economy 
Nallathur's main activity is agriculture. Rice paddy and sugarcane cultivation are prevalent.

References

External links 

 Villages in Cuddalore district
 Cities and villages in Cuddalore taluk